Panteleimonas is a community of the Dio-Olympos municipality. Before the 2011 local government reform it was part of the municipality of East Olympos, of which it was a municipal district. The 2011 census recorded 911 inhabitants in the community.

Administrative division
The community of Panteleimonas comprises the villages of Neos Panteleimonas (810 residents as of 2011), Palaios Panteleimonas (11 residents as of 2011) and Paralia Panteleimonos (90 residents as of 2011).

See also

Neos Panteleimonas
Palaios Panteleimonas
Paralia Panteleimonos
East Olympos
Dio-Olympos
List of settlements in the Pieria regional unit

References

Populated places in Pieria (regional unit)